Prem Chowdhry is an Indian social scientist, historian, and Senior Academic Fellow at the Indian Council of Historical Research, New Delhi. She is a feminist and critic of violence against couples refusing arranged marriages.

She is a well-known scholar of gender studies, authority on the political economy and social history of Haryana state in India.

Career
Chowdhry is a Life Member of the Center for Women Studies. She has also worked at the Indian Council of Social Science Research supported Centre for Contemporary Studies, New Delhi; an advanced studies unit of Nehru Memorial Museum & Library.

Chowdhry is an alumna of Jawaharlal Nehru University, and professorial fellow of the University Grants Commission.

She has provided expert commentary to news media, including to The Guardian about the impact of prejudice against having a daughter in India; to The Guardian, Associated Press, TIME, and Reuters about "honour killings"; to The Statesman about the Haryana social structure; to NPR about the Haryana social structure and how it relates to the rape of Dalit women; to The Indian Express about the political history of Indian cinema; and to Reuters about inheritance rights for women in India. Her 2004 Modern Asian Studies article "Private Lives, State Intervention: Cases of Runaway Marriage in Rural North India" was cited by the Immigration and Refugee Board of Canada in 2006.

She has also written commentary in The Tribune, including about violence related to inter-caste marriages, and advocacy for an investment in the education of girls to reduce poverty.

Art career
Chowdhry is a self-taught artist whose painting are held by the National Gallery, India and the Lalit Kala Akademi, India's National Academy of Fine Arts. She started exhibiting in 1970 and her paintings often reflect on the status of women in India.

Works

Books

Papers

Personal life
She is the daughter of Hardwari Lal, the educationist and Indian National Congress member of parliament for Haryana.

References

External links
 Prem Chowdhry – Economic and Political Weekly
 ICHR Website
 Centre for Women’s Development Studies Website

1944 births
Living people
Indian feminists
Indian women activists
English-language writers from India
20th-century Indian women writers
20th-century Indian writers
20th-century Indian historians
21st-century Indian women writers
21st-century Indian writers
21st-century Indian historians
Members of the Haryana Legislative Assembly
Indian women painters
Indian National Congress politicians from Haryana
Indian political writers
Indian feminist writers
21st-century Indian women scientists
21st-century Indian scientists
20th-century Indian women scientists
20th-century Indian social scientists
Indian women social scientists
20th-century Indian educational theorists
Indian women political writers
Activists from Haryana
Women writers from Haryana
Scholars from Haryana
Women scientists from Haryana
Women educators from Haryana
Educators from Haryana
21st-century Indian women artists
Women historians
20th-century women educators
Women members of the Haryana Legislative Assembly